The American Cinema Editors Award for Best Edited Comedy Series for Commercial Television is one of the annual awards given by the American Cinema Editors. It has evolved throughout the history of the American Cinema Editors Awards, narrowing its eligibility field numerous times. 
 From 1962 to 1972, the award did make any distinctions between continual series and/or miniseries or television movies, or the genres of comedy and drama. 
 In 1973, the award became Best Edited Episode from a Television Series, which it would remain from 20 years. 
 In 1993, the award started separating series based on their running time, becoming  Best Edited Half-Hour Series for Television.  
 In 2018, the category dropped running time distinctions, as well as adding distinctions between viewing types (commercial television vs. non-commercial), and became Best Edited Comedy Series for Commercial Television.
 In 2021, the comedy series categories were re-arranged into Best Edited Single-Camera Comedy Series and Best Edited Multi-Camera Comedy Series.

Winners and nominees
 † – indicates the winner of a Primetime Emmy Award.
 ‡ – indicates a nomination for a Primetime Emmy Award.

1960s
Best Edited Television Program

1970s

Best Edited Episode from a Television Series

1980s

1990s

Best Edited Half-Hour Series for Television

2000s

2010s

Best Edited Comedy Series for Commercial Television

2020s

Best Edited Single-Camera Comedy Series

Programs with multiple awards

5 awards
 M*A*S*H (CBS)

3 awards
 Frasier (NBC)
 Sex and the City (HBO)

2 awards
 30 Rock (NBC)
 The Big Valley (ABC)
 Brooklyn Bridge (CBS)
 Chicago Hope (CBS)
 Curb Your Enthusiasm (HBO)
 The Dick Powell Show (NBC)
 Hill Street Blues (NBC)
 The Larry Sanders Show (HBO)
 Medical Center (CBS)
 The Office (NBC)
 St. Elsewhere (NBC)
 Veep (HBO)

Programs with multiple nominations

10 nominations
 M*A*S*H (CBS)

7 nominations
 Frasier (NBC)

5 nominations
 Curb Your Enthusiasm (HBO)
 Sex and the City (HBO)

4 nominations
 30 Rock (NBC)
 Cagney & Lacey (CBS)
 The Larry Sanders Show (HBO)
 Lou Grant (CBS)
 Seinfeld (NBC)
 Veep (HBO)
 Will & Grace (NBC)

3 nominations
 Arrested Development (Fox/Netflix)
 The Big Valley (ABC)
 Cheers (NBC)
 Entourage (HBO)
 The Good Place (NBC)
 Ironside (NBC)
 L.A. Law (NBC)
 Modern Family (ABC)
 Northern Exposure (CBS)
 The Office (NBC)
 Silicon Valley (HBO)
 St. Elsewhere (NBC)

2 nominations
 3rd Rock from the Sun (NBC)
 Atlanta (FX)
 Bewitched (ABC)
 Bonanza (NBC)
 Brooklyn Bridge (CBS)
 Crazy Ex-Girlfriend (The CW)
 Dallas (CBS)
 The Dick Powell Show (NBC)
 The Eleventh Hour (NBC)
 Everybody Loves Raymond (CBS)
 Gunsmoke (CBS)
 Hawaii Five-O (CBS)
 The High Chaparral (NBC)
 In the Heat of the Night (NBC)
 I Spy (NBC)
 Malcolm in the Middle (Fox)
 Medical Center (CBS)
 Murphy Brown (CBS)
 My Name Is Earl (NBC)
 Nurse Jackie (Showtime)
 Police Story (NBC)
 Portlandia (IFC)
 Rawhide (CBS)
 Schitt's Creek (Pop)
 The Streets of San Francisco (ABC)
 Wagon Train (NBC)
 The Waltons (CBS)
 What We Do in the Shadows (FX)
 The Wonder Years (ABC)

References

External links
 

American Cinema Editors Awards